Mountain Grove City Hall, also known as Mountain Grove City Hall and Jail, is a historic city hall located at Mountain Grove, Wright County, Missouri.  It was built in 1937–1938, and is a two-story, flat-roofed building in the Works Progress Administration (WPA)'s version of Modern style, WPA Moderne.  The building is clad in unfinished native field stone with beaded mortar joints, a technique commonly referred to as "Ozark rock" or "giraffe rock" construction.  It was funded by the WPA and constructed with local labor.

It was listed on the National Register of Historic Places in 2012.

References

Works Progress Administration in Missouri
Government buildings on the National Register of Historic Places in Missouri
Modernist architecture in Missouri
Government buildings completed in 1938
Buildings and structures in Wright County, Missouri
National Register of Historic Places in Wright County, Missouri
WPA Moderne architecture